USS Chesapeake may refer to:

, a 38-gun frigate in commission from 1800 to 1813
USS Chesapeake, a sloop renamed  in 1799 while still under construction, launched in 1799, and sold in 1801
USS Chesapeake, a bark which served as a training ship from 1900 to 1910, was renamed  in 1905, and served as a submarine tender from 1910 until decommissioned in 1916
, a salvage ship in commission from March to October 1919
, a transport tanker in service from 2000 to 2009
,  a proposed Constellation class guided missile frigate

United States Navy ship names